Karen Matamoros (born 11 September 1982) is a Costa Rican cyclist. She competed in the women's cross-country mountain biking event at the 2004 Summer Olympics.

References

1982 births
Living people
Costa Rican female cyclists
Olympic cyclists of Costa Rica
Cyclists at the 2004 Summer Olympics
Place of birth missing (living people)